William Andrews Clark Sr. (January 8, 1839March 2, 1925) was an American politician and entrepreneur, involved with mining, banking, and railroads.

Biography

Clark was born in Connellsville, Pennsylvania. He moved with his family to Iowa in 1856 where he taught school and studied law at Iowa Wesleyan College. In 1862, he traveled west to become a miner. After working in quartz mines in Colorado, in 1863 Clark made his way to new gold fields to find his fortune in the Montana gold rush.

He settled in the capital of Montana Territory, Bannack, Montana, and began placer mining. Though his claim paid only moderately, Clark invested his earnings in becoming a trader, driving mules back and forth between Salt Lake City and the boomtowns of Montana to transport eggs and other basic supplies.

He soon changed careers again and became a banker in Deer Lodge, Montana. He repossessed mining properties when owners defaulted on their loans, placing him in the mining industry. He made a fortune with copper mining, small smelters, electric power companies, newspapers, railroads (trolley lines around Butte and the San Pedro, Los Angeles and Salt Lake Railroad from Salt Lake City, Utah to San Pedro and Los Angeles, California), and other businesses, becoming known as one of three "Copper Kings" of Butte, Montana, along with Marcus Daly and F. Augustus Heinze.

Between 1884 and 1888, Clark constructed a 34-room, Tiffany-decorated home on West Granite Street, incorporating the most modern inventions available, in Butte, Montana. This home is now the Copper King Mansion bed-and-breakfast, as well as a museum.   In 1899, Clark built Columbia Gardens for the children of Butte. It included flower gardens, a dance pavilion, an amusement park, a lake, and picnic areas. An evening scene between characters Arline Simms (played by Anne Francis) and Buz Murdock (played by George Maharis) from the Route 66 television series 1961 episode "A Month of Sundays" was shot on location at Columbia Gardens where she emotionally falls into his arms on the grand staircase. Clark later built a much larger and more extravagant 121-room mansion on Fifth Avenue in New York City, the William A. Clark House.

He died on March 2, 1925, and is interred in Woodlawn Cemetery in the Bronx, New York City.

Political career 

Clark served as president of both Montana state constitutional conventions in 1884 and 1889.

Clark yearned to be a statesman and used his newspaper, the Butte Miner, to push his political ambitions. At this time, Butte was one of the largest cities in the West. He became a hero in Helena, Montana, by campaigning for its selection as the state capital instead of Anaconda. This battle for the placement of the capital had subtle Irish vs. English, Catholic vs. Protestant, and non-Masonic vs. Masonic elements.

Clark's long-standing dream of becoming a United States Senator resulted in scandal in 1899 when it was revealed that he bribed members of the Montana State Legislature in return for their votes. At the time, U.S. Senators were chosen by their respective state legislatures. The corruption of his election contributed to the passage of the 17th Amendment. The U.S. Senate refused to seat Clark because of the 1899 bribery scheme, but a later senate campaign was successful, and he served a single term from 1901 until 1907. In responding to criticism of his bribery of the Montana legislature, Clark is reported to have said, "I never bought a man who wasn't for sale."

Clark died at the age of 86 in his New York City mansion. His estate at his death was estimated to be worth $300 million, (equivalent to $ in today's dollars), making him one of the wealthiest Americans ever.

In a 1907 essay, Mark Twain, who was a close friend of Clark's rival, Henry H. Rogers, an organizer of the Amalgamated Copper Mining Company, portrayed Clark as the very embodiment of Gilded Age excess and corruption:

Family

Clark was married twice. His first marriage was to Katherine Louise "Kate" Stauffer in 1869 until her death in 1893.

Together, they had seven children, including Charles Walker Clark and William Andrews Clark Jr. 

After Kate's death in 1893, William married his second wife, the woman who had been his teenage ward, Anna Eugenia La Chapelle (March 10, 1878, Michigan – October 11, 1963, New York). They claimed to have been married in 1901 in France. Anna was 23 and William was 62. They had two children:
 Louise Amelia Andrée Clark (August 13, 1902, Spain – August 6, 1919, Rangeley, Maine)
 Huguette Marcelle Clark (June 9, 1906, Paris, France – May 24, 2011, New York City)

In early 1946, Anna commissioned the Paganini Quartet, and acquired the four famous Stradivarius instruments once owned by Niccolo Paganini for their use.

Clark donated 135 acres to the Girl Scouts in honor of his elder daughter (by his second wife), Louise Amelia Andrée (who died a week before her 17th birthday of meningitis), who had been very happy there. The Girl Scout camp in Briarcliff Manor was named Camp Andree Clark.

William Andrews Clark Jr.

Clark's son, William Andrews Clark Jr., founder of the Los Angeles Philharmonic in 1919, left his library of rare books and manuscripts to the regents of the University of California, Los Angeles. Today, the William Andrews Clark Memorial Library specializes in English literature and history from 1641 to 1800, materials related to Oscar Wilde and his associates, and fine printing.

Huguette Marcelle Clark

Huguette (pronounced ), born in Paris, France in June 1906, was the youngest child of Clark with his second wife, Anna Eugenia La Chapelle. She married once but divorced less than a year later. She led a reclusive life thereafter, seldom communicating with the public nor with her extended family. For many years, she lived in three combined apartments, with a total of 42 rooms, on New York's Fifth Avenue at 72nd Street, overlooking Central Park. In 1991, she moved out and for the remainder of her life lived in various New York City hospitals.

In February 2010, she became the subject of a series of reports on MSNBC after it was reported that the caretakers of her three residences (including a $24 million estate in Connecticut, a sprawling seaside estate in Santa Barbara, California and her Fifth Avenue apartments valued at $100 million) had not seen her in decades. These articles were the basis for the 2013 bestselling book Empty Mansions: The Mysterious Life of Huguette Clark and the Spending of a Great American Fortune. by investigative reporter Bill Dedman and Paul Clark Newell, Jr.

Her final residence was Beth Israel Medical Center, where she died on the morning of May 24, 2011, age 104. Huguette's extraordinary collection of arts and antiquities were consigned to go on the auction block at Christie's in June 2014, over three years after her death.

Walter Clark
Clark's nephew, Walter Miller Clark, son of James Ross and Miriam Augusta (Evans) Clark, along with Walter's wife, Virginia (McDowell) Clark, were passengers on the RMS Titanic. He was among the 1,514 who died on April 15, 1912, after the ship struck an iceberg at 2:20 a.m. Walter's wife, Virginia, was rescued by the RMS Carpathia, and arrived in New York City a widow. 

Some of Mr. Clark's personal items were retrieved in the debris field during an expedition to the site of the sinking in 1994. They were identified by engraved initials. They included shaving soap, toiletry items, cuff links, and gambling chips.

Legacy
Clark's art collection was donated to the Corcoran Gallery in Washington, D.C. after his death, greatly enriching that museum's holdings of European as well as American art. The Clark donation also included the construction of a new wing for the Corcoran, known appropriately as the Clark Wing.

Clark County, Nevada
The city of Las Vegas was established as a maintenance stop for Clark's San Pedro, Los Angeles and Salt Lake Railroad. He subdivided  into 1200 lots, some of which on the corner of Fremont Street in Las Vegas sold for as much as $1750. The Las Vegas area was organized as Clark County, Nevada, in Clark's honor. Clark's involvement in the founding of Las Vegas is recounted in a decidedly negative light by Chris Romano in the "Las Vegas" episode of Comedy Central's Drunk History, with Rich Fulcher portraying Clark.

Clarkdale, Arizona
Clarkdale, Arizona, named for Clark, was the site of smelting operations for Clark's mines in nearby Jerome, Arizona. The town includes the historic Clark Mansion, which sustained severe fire damage on June 25, 2010. Clarkdale is home to the Verde Canyon Railroad wilderness train ride which follows the historic route that Clark had constructed in 1911 and home to the Copper Art Museum.

See also

 Andree Clark Bird Refuge, Santa Barbara, California
 Atlantic Cable Quartz Lode
 List of historic properties in Clarkdale, Arizona
 Mary Andrews Clark Memorial Home – a landmark Los Angeles home for women built by Clark as a memorial for his mother

Notes

Sources

 NBCNews.com: Huguette Clark, the reclusive heiress, and the men managing her money, an NBCNews.com special report

External links

 NBCNews.com: Huguette Clark, the reclusive heiress, and the men managing her money, an NBCNews.com special report
 Empty Mansions: The Mysterious Life of Huguette Clark and the Spending of a Great American Fortune
 Biographical Sketch
 

|-

1839 births
1925 deaths
American bankers
American philanthropists
Burials at Woodlawn Cemetery (Bronx, New York)
American businesspeople in metals
Democratic Party United States senators from Montana
History of Clark County, Nevada
Clark, William A.
Iowa Wesleyan University alumni
Montana Democrats
Montana pioneers
People from Connellsville, Pennsylvania
People from Deer Lodge, Montana
Use mdy dates from August 2011
William A.